Certification of Ships' Cooks Convention, 1946 is  an International Labour Organization Convention (Number 69).

It was established in 1946, with the preamble stating:
Having decided upon the adoption of certain proposals with regard to the certification of ships' cooks,...

Revision
The principles of the convention were revised in the Maritime Labour Convention.

Ratifications 
As of 2023, the convention had been ratified by 38 states. Of the ratifying states, 28 have subsequently denounced the treaty.

References

External links 
Text.
Ratifications.

International Labour Organization conventions
Treaties concluded in 1946
Treaties entered into force in 1953
Treaties of the People's Republic of Angola
Treaties of Azerbaijan
Treaties of Belgium
Treaties of Bosnia and Herzegovina
Treaties of Djibouti
Treaties of Egypt
Treaties of Guinea-Bissau
Treaties of Indonesia
Treaties of Ireland
Treaties of Italy
Treaties of Japan
Treaties of Kyrgyzstan
Treaties of Montenegro
Treaties of New Zealand
Treaties of Panama
Treaties of Peru
Treaties of the Estado Novo (Portugal)
Treaties of Slovenia
Treaties of North Macedonia
Treaties of Yugoslavia
Treaties of Tajikistan
Treaties of Turkey
Treaties of the Ukrainian Soviet Socialist Republic
Treaties of the United Kingdom
Treaties of Algeria
Treaties of Ghana
Admiralty law treaties
Food treaties
Treaties extended to Jersey
Treaties extended to the Isle of Man
Treaties extended to Guernsey
Treaties extended to French Guiana
Treaties extended to Guadeloupe
Treaties extended to Martinique
Treaties extended to Réunion
Treaties extended to Curaçao and Dependencies
1946 in labor relations